Khawaja Muhammad Aslam (8 February 1922 – 23 July 2019) was a Pakistani athlete who represented Pakistan in the 1954 Asian Games in the 200m. He won the silver medal with the time of 22sec. The gold medal winner was also a Pakistani athlete, Muhammad Sharif Butt, with the time of 21.9sec.

Aslam also competed at the 1952 Summer Olympics in Helsinki in the 100m and 200m events, as well as the men's 4 × 100 m relay. He finished fifth in the 1954 British Empire and Commonwealth Games 4×110 yards relay (with Abdul Aziz, Abdul Khaliq, and Muhammad Sharif Butt). In the 1954 British Empire and Commonwealth Games 100 yards as well as in the 220 yards Aslam was eliminated in the heats.

Aslam died on 23 July 2019 at the age of 97 in Pakistan. He was the father of Olympian Khawaja Junaid.

Competition record

References

1922 births
2019 deaths
Pakistani male sprinters
Asian Games medalists in athletics (track and field)
Olympic athletes of Pakistan
Athletes (track and field) at the 1952 Summer Olympics
Athletes (track and field) at the 1954 Asian Games
Athletes (track and field) at the 1954 British Empire and Commonwealth Games
Commonwealth Games competitors for Pakistan
Asian Games silver medalists for Pakistan
Medalists at the 1954 Asian Games